Pavarit Saensook (born May 8, 1987), is a Thai retired professional footballer who played as a left back.

Personal life
Pavarit has a brother Pakasit Saensook is also a footballer as a defender.

Honours

Clubs
Chula United
 Regional League Division 2: 2006

External links
 Profile at Goal

1987 births
Living people
Pavarit Saensook
Pavarit Saensook
Association football fullbacks
Pavarit Saensook
Pavarit Saensook
Pavarit Saensook
Pavarit Saensook
Pavarit Saensook
Pavarit Saensook